The 25th Anniversary Rock and Roll Hall of Fame Concerts were a two-day concert series celebrating the 25th anniversary of the Rock and Roll Hall of Fame. It took place on October 29 and 30, 2009 at Madison Square Garden and the tickets cost between US$75 and US$2,000.

The idea behind the concert was to have Hall of Fame inductees perform in eight segments (Crosby, Stills and Nash, Simon and Garfunkel, Stevie Wonder, Bruce Springsteen, Aretha Franklin, Jeff Beck, Metallica and U2) and to present their own songs or songs originally performed by other Hall of Fame inductees. Eric Clapton was set to perform, but pulled out due to having his gallstones removed. Jeff Beck performed as his replacement.

A four-hour compilation of the concert was first broadcast by the US television provider HBO on November 29, 2009. In addition, the concert was released on DVD (HBO compilation on two DVDs plus a bonus DVD), on Blu-ray and on two double CDs or as a 4-CD box (including six bonus pieces).

The appearance of Metallica with Lou Reed eventually led to the recordings of the album Lulu.

Night 1

Night 2

HBO 3-disc DVD Set 
This is the order of performances on the DVD discs. For concert order, see preceding sections "Night 1" and "Night 2".

DVD disc 1 
 Tom Hanks
 Introduction

 Jerry Lee Lewis
 Great Balls Of Fire

 Crosby, Stills & Nash
 Woodstock
 Almost Cut My Hair
 Love Has No Pride (with Bonnie Raitt)
 The Pretender (with Jackson Browne)
 Love The One You're With (with James Taylor)

 Stevie Wonder
 For Once In My Life
 The Tracks Of My Tears (with Smokey Robinson)
 The Way You Make Me Feel (with John Legend)
 The Thrill Is Gone (with B.B. King)
 Higher Ground/Roxanne (with Sting)
 Superstition (with Jeff Beck)

 Paul Simon
 Me And Julio Down By The Schoolyard
 You Can Call Me Al
 Here Comes The Sun (with David Crosby and Graham Nash)
 The Wanderer (with Dion Dimucci)

 Little Anthony & The Imperials
 Two People In The World

 Simon & Garfunkel
 The Sounds Of Silence
 The Boxer
 Bridge Over Troubled Water

 Aretha Franklin
 Baby I Love You
 Don't Play That Song
 Chain Of Fools (with Annie Lennox)

DVD disc 2 
 Metallica
 For Whom The Bell Tolls
 Sweet Jane (with Lou Reed)
 Iron Man/Paranoid (with Ozzy Osbourne) (duplicated on bonus disc 3)
 All Day And All Of The Night (with Ray Davies)
 Enter Sandman

 U2
 Vertigo
 Magnificent
 Because The Night (with Bruce Springsteen, Patti Smith, and Roy Bittan)
 I Still Haven't Found What I'm Looking For (with Bruce Springsteen)
 Gimme Shelter (with Mick Jagger, Fergie and Will.I.Am)
 Stuck In A Moment You Can't Get Out Of (with Mick Jagger)
 Beautiful Day

 Jeff Beck
 People Get Ready (with Sting)
 Let Me Love You Baby (with Buddy Guy)
 Foxey Lady (with Billy Gibbons)
 A Day In The Life

 Bruce Springsteen & The E Street Band
 Hold On, I'm Comin'/Soul Man (with Sam Moore)
 The Ghost Of Tom Joad (with Tom Morello)
 Fortunate Son (with John Fogerty)
 Oh, Pretty Woman (with John Fogerty)
 Jungleland
 A Fine Fine Boy (with Darlene Love)
 New York State Of Mind (with Billy Joel)
 Born To Run (with Billy Joel)
 (Your Love Keeps Lifting Me) Higher And Higher (with Darlene Love, John Fogerty, Sam Moore, Billy Joel, and Tom Morello) (duplicated on bonus disc 3)
 credits

DVD disc 3 (bonus) 
 Crosby, Stills & Nash
 Mexico (with James Taylor)
 Teach Your Children (with Bonnie Raitt, Jackson Browne, and James Taylor)

 Stevie Wonder
 Uptight (Everything's Alright)
 I Was Made To Love Her
 Signed, Sealed, Delivered I'm Yours
 Mercy Mercy Me (The Ecology) (with John Legend)

 Simon & Garfunkel
 Mrs. Robinson/Not Fade Away

 Metallica
 Turn The Page
 Iron Man/Paranoid (with Ozzy Osbourne) (duplicate of performance on disc 2)

 U2
 Mysterious Ways
 Where Is The Love/One (with The Black Eyed Peas)

 Jeff Beck
 Freeway Jam
 Big Block

 Bruce Springsteen & The E Street Band
 London Calling (with Tom Morello)
 (Your Love Keeps Lifting Me) Higher And Higher (with Darlene Love, John Fogerty, Sam Moore, Billy Joel, and Tom Morello) (duplicate of performance on disc 2)
 credits

References

External links 
 Rock & Roll Hall of Fame Official Website

Concerts in the United States
Rock and Roll Hall of Fame